David Geringas (born 29 July 1946 in Vilnius) is a Lithuanian cellist and conductor who studied under Mstislav Rostropovich. In 1970 he won the gold medal at the International Tchaikovsky Competition.  He also plays the baryton, a rare instrument associated with music of Joseph Haydn.

Biography

David Geringas has performed as soloist with the greatest orchestras around the globe, including the Berlin Philharmonic, Vienna Philharmonic, Royal Concertgebouw Orchestra, London Symphony, Philharmonia, Royal Philharmonic, London Philharmonic, Orchestre de Paris, Czech Philharmonic, Bavarian Radio Symphony, Leipzig Gewandhaus Orchestra, Chicago Symphony, New York Philharmonic, Philadelphia, NHK Symphony and Israel Philharmonic, under such esteemed conductors of our time as Gerd Albrecht, Vladimir Ashkenazy, Herbert Blomstedt, Andrey Boreyko, Myung-whun Chung, Charles Dutoit, Christoph Eschenbach, Vladimir Fedoseyev, Lawrence Foster, Valery Gergiev, Paavo Järvi, Kirill Kondrashin, Krzysztof Penderecki, Simon Rattle, Mstislav Rostropovich, Esa-Pekka Salonen, Jukka-Pekka Saraste, Wolfgang Sawallisch, Horst Stein, Yuri Temirkanov, Klaus Tennstedt and Michael Tilson Thomas.
He is a regular guest at several major chamber music festival and has a vast repertoire, from baroque to contemporary music, much of which he has recorded, being awarded the Grand Prix du Disque of the Charles Cros Academy in 1989. He is a cello professor in Berlin.

Important contemporary composers such as Sofia Gubaidulina, Pēteris Vasks and Erkki-Sven Tüür have dedicated new compositions to Geringas. In July 2006, Anatolijus Senderovas' composition "David's Song for Cello and String Quartet" was premièred in Kronberg – a dedication to Geringas's 60th birthday.

David Geringas is one of the most versatile musicians of our time. The cellist and conductor has an unusually broad repertoire from the earliest baroque up to contemporary music. He was the first musician to play in the West works of the Russian and Lithuanian avant garde and many composers dedicated works to him. For his worldwide engagement for Lithuanian music and its composers he was awarded highest distinctions of his country. In October 2006 the President of the Federal Republic of Germany Horst Köhler awarded the "Verdienstkreuz 1. Klasse des Verdienstordens der Bundesrepublik Deutschland" (Federal Cross of Merit) to David Geringas for his overall efforts as musician and German Cultural Ambassador to the world music scene.

Born in Vilnius, Lithuania, David Geringas studied at the Moscow Conservatory from 1963 until 1973 with Mstislav Rostropovich. In 1970 David Geringas won the First Prize and the gold medal at the Tchaikovsky competition.  In 2000 he took over a professorship of cello at the Hochschule für Musik "Hanns Eisler" in Berlin. Moreover, he is honorary professor at the Moscow Conservatory. David Geringas also heads various master-classes all over the world for the up-and-coming musicians. His students are winners of prizes and awards of international competitions.

Renowned composers of contemporary music dedicated works to David Geringas, thus the Concerto in Do by Anatolijus Šenderovas, being played by David Geringas for the first time in 2002 and being awarded the European Composers Prize in Berlin, the Cello Concerto by Ned Rorem, world premiere 2003 in the US, the Cello Concertos by Vytautas Laurušas and by Vidmantas Bartulis, world premiere 2004 respective 2005 in Lithuania. A special event was the world premiere of Anatolijus Šenderovas' work "David's Song for Cello and String Quartet" in July 2006 in Kronberg which the composer had written on the occasion of David Geringas' 60th birthday.

He has been teaching at the Accademia Musicale Chigiana in Siena since 2005.

David Geringas' concerts with the Symphonieorchester des Bayerischen Rundfunks, the Vienna Radio Symphony Orchestra, the Moscow State Philharmonic Orchestra, the Orchestre de la Suisse Romande and the Berner Symphonie-Orchester, the Tokyo Philharmonic Orchestra as well as his first performance with the Shanghai Symphony Orchestra at once being reinvited for 2007, belong among others to the highlights of the concert season 2005/2006. He was also guest at prestigious festivals in Germany, Great Britain and France this summer.
In the season 2006/2007 David Geringas will give concerts among others with the Beethoven Orchester Bonn, the Nationaltheater-Orchester Mannheim and the Galicia Symphony Orchestra. On the occasion of D. Shostakovich's 100th Birthday David Geringas is invited by the Tonhalle Düsseldorf to arrange and to head a weekend of several performances dedicated to the composer.

Discography

For about 50 CDs which David Geringas has up to now recorded he received a large number of distinctions, among them the Grand Prix du Disque for the recording of the 12 cello concerti by Luigi Boccherini. His extensive discography also includes many award-winning recordings such as the chamber music by Henri Dutilleux (Diapason d'Or) or the cello concertos by Hans Pfitzner (Jahrespreis der Deutschen Schallplattenkritik).

 Eli Zion – from St. Petersburg to Jerusalem
 Musik der Neuen Jüdischen Schule für Cello und Klavier
 Works by:
 Joseph Achron, Ernst Bloch, Sinowi Feldman, Solomon Rosowsky, Lazare Saminsky, Joachim Stutschewsky, Leo Zeitlin
 with Jascha Nemtsov, piano
 Tschaikowsky-Variationen
 Tchaikovsky, Arensky
 David Geringas, conductor and cellist
 Südwestdeutsches Kammerorchester Pforzheim
 J. S. Bach, 6 Suites for Cello (1995)
 Bach (1989)
 Suite No. 1
 Suite No. 2
 Suite No. 6
 Bach (1989)
 Suite No. 3
 Suite No. 4
 Suite No. 5
 Quasi Improvisata (2003)
 Anatolijus Senderovas - Songs of Sulamite
 Sofia Gubaidulina - In Croce
 Lepo Sumera - Quasi Improvisata
 Eduardas Balsys - Habanera
 Ástor Piazzolla - Tanti Anni Prima, Oblivion, Hommage à Liège
 with Geir Draugsvoll, bayan
 Mozartiana - Hommage à Mozart (1992)
 Mozart - Andantino for piano and cello, K.Anh. 46
 Beethoven - Seven variations in E-flat major for cello and piano
 "Bei Männern, welche Liebe fühlen" from Mozart's The Magic Flute
 Helene Liebmann - "Grande Sonate pour Pianoforte et Violincelle" in B-flat major, Op. 11
 Beethoven - Twelve variations in F major, Op. 66 for cello and piano
 "Ein Mädchen oder Weibchen" from Mozart's The Magic Flute
 Joseph Wölfl - "Grand Duo pour Piano et Violoncelle" in D minor, Op. 31
 Franz Xaver Mozart - From the Grand Sonata for piano and cello, Op. 19
 with Tatjana Schatz, piano
 Boccherini - 12 Concerti per il Violoncello (1988)
 Concerto No. 1 in E-flat major, G 474
 Concerto No. 2 in A major, G 475
 Concerto No. 3 in D major, G 476
 Concerto No. 4 in C major, G 477
 Concerto No. 5 in D major, G 478
 Concerto No. 6 in D major, G 479
 Concerto No. 7 in G major, G 480
 Concerto No. 8 in C major, G 481
 Concerto No. 9 in B-flat major, G 482
 Concerto No. 10 in D major, G 483
 Concerto No. 11 in C major, G 573
 Concerto No. 12 in E-flat, major
 Orchestra da Camera di Padova e del Veneto
 Conductor: Bruno Giuranna
 Brahms - Double Concerto for violin, cello and orchestra, in A minor, Op. 102 (1989)
 Symphony No. 4 in E minor, Op. 98
 Mark Kaplan, violin
 Sinfonieorchester des Südwestfunks Baden-Baden
 Conductor: Michael Gielen
 Solo for Tatjana (1997)
 György Ligeti - Sonata for cello solo
 Gerhard Schedl - from "Zwei Stücke aus der Schatz-Truhe"
 Viktor Suslin - Schatz-Island
 Krzysztof Meyer - Monolog
 Anatolijus Senderovas - Due Canti
 Pēteris Vasks - Gramata cellam
 Paul Hindemith - Sonata for cello solo, Op. 25, No. 3
 Pablo Casals - Cant dell Ocells
 Dvořák (2003)
 Cello Concerto in B minor, Op. 104, B. 191
 Rondo in G minor, Op. 94, B. 181
 Silent Woods, B. 182
 Czech Philharmonic Orchestra
 Conductor Ken-Ichiro Kobayashi
 Ali Baba and the forty robbers (1997)
 Musical fairytale from the "Thousand and One Nights"
 Narrator: Manfred Steffen
 Music: Alexander Geringas
 Violin: Natalia Prishepenko
 Flute: Wolfgang Ritter
 Piano/song: Alexander Geringas
 Bass: Johannes Huth
 Drums: Martin Engelbach
 Gubaidulina (2000)
 "Und: Das Fest ist in vollem Gang"
 Badische Staatskapelle Karlsruhe
 Conductor: Kazushi Ono
 Haydn (1994)
 Cello Concerto in C major, Hob. VIIb-1
 Ceccl Concerto in D major, Hob. VIIb-2
 Andante from Symphony No. 13 for Cello and Orchestra
 Czech Philharmonic Chamber Orchestra
 My recollections (2002)
 Vytautas Barkauskas - Suites de concert, Op. 98
 Bronius Kutavicius - Rhythmus-Arhythmus
 Anatolijus Senderovas - Due canti
 with  Tatjana Schatz-Geringas, piano
 Osvaldas Balakauskas - Dal vento
 Mindaugas Urbaitis - Reminiscences
 with Petras Geniusas, piano
 Pfitzner (1993)
 Cello Concerto in A minor, Op. 52
 Cello Concerto in G major in one movement, Op. 42
 Cello Concerto in A minor, Op. posth.
 Bamberg Symphony Orchestra
 Werner Andreas Albert
 David Geringas * Tatjana Schatz (1994)
 Dmitri Shostakovich - Sonata, Op. 40
 Prokofiev
 Sonata, Op. 119
 Adagio from Cinderella, Op. 97a
 Mstislav Rostropovich - Humoreske, Op. 5
 Tatjana Schatz, Piano
 Schnittke (1998–99)
 Epilogue from the ballet "Peer Gynt"
 Musica nostalgica
 Cello Sonata No. 1
 Tatjana Schatz, Piano
 Piano Trios
 Mieczyslaw Weinberg - Piano Trio, Op. 24
 Alexander Weprik - Drei Volkstänze, Op. 13b
 Dmitri Shostakovich - Piano Trio, Op. 67
 Dmitry Sitkovetsky, Violin
 Jasha Nemtsov, Piano
 David Geringas * Tatjana Schatz (1994)
 Schumann
 Adagio and Allegro, Op. 70
 Fantasiestücke, Op. 73
 Stücke im Volkston, Op. 102
 Schubert
 Arpeggione Sonata in A minor, D. 821
 Tatjana Schatz, piano
 David Geringas * Tatjana Schatz (1993)
 Richard Strauss
 Cello Sonata, Op. 6
 Romance in F Major
 Erwin Schulhoff - Cello Sonata, Op. 17
 Tatjana Schatz, piano
 Anatolijus Senderovas (2002)
 Concerto in Do
 Symphony Orchestra of the Lithuanian Academy of Music
 Robertas Servenikas, Conductor
 Lepo Sumera (2003)
 Cello Concerto
 Musica profana
 Symphony No. 6
 Estonian National Symphony Orchestra
 Paavo Järvi, Conductor
 Erkki-Sven Tüür
 Symphony No. 3
 Cello Concerto
 Lighthouse
 Radio-Symphonieorchester Wien
 Dennis Russell Davies, conductor
 Pēteris Vasks
 Cello Concerto
 String Symphony - Voices (Balsis)
 Riga Philharmonic Orchestra
 Jonas Aleksa, Conductor
 Schostakowitsch - Schulhoff
 Shostakovich - String Quartet No. 14
 with Gidon Kremer, Violin - Yuzuko Horigome, Violin - Kim Kashkashian, Viola
 Erwin Schulhoff - Sextet
 with Gidon Kremer, Violin - Philip Hirschhorn, Violin - Nobuko Imai, Viola - Kim Kashkashian, Viola - Julius Berger, cello
 Erwin Schulhoff - Duo for Violin and Cello
 with Philip Hirschhorn, Violin
 Krzysztof Meyer (2006)
 Canzona für Violoncello und Klavier
 with Tanja Schatz, Klavier

Chamber music 

David Geringas is also a welcome guest at international chamber music stages. So Tatjana Geringas and Ian Fountain belong to his closest partners on the piano. In the season 2004/2005 David Geringas gave together with Ian Fountain a concert series entitled "Beethoven plus…" at the Philharmonie Berlin. He also works closely together with the Artemis Quartett, the Vogler-Quartett and the Bläserquintett of the Staatskapelle Berlin.

Conducting 

To an ever-growing extent David Geringas has been engaged as conductor. Among others he conducted the Norddeutsche Philharmonie Rostock, the Kammerphilharmonie of the MDR Leipzig, the Jenaer Philharmonie, the chamber orchestra of the Wiener Symphoniker (Concert-Verein), the Danish National Symphony Orchestra/DR, das Iceland Symphony Orchestra, the Kremerata Baltica as well as orchestras in Lithuania, Italy, the Netherlands, Mexico and Costa Rica. In February 2007 David Geringas will conduct for the first time the Tokyo Philharmonic Orchestra, give his debut as conductor in China in the 2007/2008 season and will be guest again in Japan.

For his first CD recording as conductor he received the 'Choc de la Musique' of the music magazine Le Monde de la musique.

Since 2005 David Geringas has been Chief Guest Conductor of the Kyushu Symphony Orchestra.

Cello 

David Geringas plays a G. B. Guadagnini cello made in 1761.

References

Sources
The Classical Music Guide Forums

External links 
 Home page of David Geringas
 Kajimoto Concert Management
 David Geringas - Accademia Musicale Chigiana

Bibliography

1946 births
Living people
German classical cellists
German male conductors (music)
Lithuanian classical cellists
Lithuanian educators
Lithuanian conductors (music)
Officers Crosses of the Order of Merit of the Federal Republic of Germany
Academic staff of the Hochschule für Musik Hanns Eisler Berlin
Musicians from Vilnius
Recipients of the Lithuanian National Prize
Lithuanian Jews
20th-century Lithuanian musicians
21st-century Lithuanian musicians
20th-century German conductors (music)
21st-century German conductors (music)
20th-century German male musicians
21st-century German male musicians
20th-century cellists
21st-century cellists